Trnava is a village in the municipality of Raška, Serbia. According to the 2011 census, the village has a population of 219 people.

References

Populated places in Raška District
Medieval sites in Serbia